Neoregelia pauciflora is a species of flowering plant in the genus Neoregelia. This species is endemic to Brazil. The specific epithet pauciflora is Latin for 'few-flowered'.

Cultivars
 Neoregelia 'Ariel'
 Neoregelia 'Cheers'
 Neoregelia 'Clover'
 Neoregelia 'Domino'
 Neoregelia 'Frog Prince'
 Neoregelia 'Heart's Desire'
 Neoregelia 'Ink Spots'
 Neoregelia 'Jeanne Garman'
 Neoregelia 'Joybringer'
 Neoregelia 'Karamea Bon Ton'
 Neoregelia 'Karamea Mattino'
 Neoregelia 'Karamea Shadows'
 Neoregelia 'Natascha'
 Neoregelia 'Obsidian Ice'
 Neoregelia 'Ounce Of Purple'
 Neoregelia 'Pauciflora Red'
 Neoregelia 'Pauciflora Yellow'
 Neoregelia 'Purple Princess'
 Neoregelia 'Red Clover'
 Neoregelia 'Royal Flush'
 Neoregelia 'Shamrock'
 Neoregelia 'Tar Baby'
 Neoregelia 'Treasure Island'

References

BSI Cultivar Registry Retrieved 11 October 2009

pauciflora
Flora of Brazil